The Battle is the first studio album by hard rock supergroup Allen-Lande, a collaboration between vocalists Russell Allen and Jørn Lande. It was released on 19 September 2005, and is the first of three albums in a row to feature Magnus Karlsson as songwriter, producer and performer of most instruments, and Jaime Salazar on drums.

Track listing

Personnel 
Musicians
Russell Allen - lead and backing vocals
Jørn Lande - lead and backing vocals
Magnus Karlsson - guitars, bass guitar, keyboards
Jaime Salazar - drums

Production
Anders Theander, Magnus Karlsson, Serafino Perugino - production
Rodney Matthews - cover art

References

2005 debut albums
Allen-Lande albums
Frontiers Records albums
Albums with cover art by Rodney Matthews
Vocal duet albums